Nargiz Akif gizi Gurbanova (born 1975) is an Azerbaijani diplomat, serving as the Ambassador of Azerbaijan to Poland since 2021.

Education
Gurbanova graduated from the University of Vienna with a Ph.D in political science. She also received BA/MA in international relations from the Baku State University and MSc in international management from the Western University in Azerbaijan. Gurbanova also studied international business at the Jönköping International Business School in Sweden and international law at the University of Nice in France.

Diplomatic service
Gurbanova served as director of the Department for Economic Cooperation and Development at the Ministry of Foreign Affairs of Azerbaijan. She then served in the Embassy of Azerbaijan to Austria and the Embassy of Azerbaijan to the United States, where she worked as Counselor, Chargé d'Affaires and Deputy Chief of Mission.

On 8 January 2021, Gurbanova was appointed the Ambassador of Azerbaijan to Poland by a presidential decree, succeeding Hasan Hasanov. She previously served as the ambassador to Bulgary.

Personal life
Gurbanova is married and has one son.

References

1975 births
Ambassadors of Azerbaijan to Poland
Azerbaijani women ambassadors
21st-century Azerbaijani women
Living people
Ambassadors of Azerbaijan to Bulgaria
University of Vienna alumni
Baku State University alumni
Western Caspian University alumni
Ambassadors of Azerbaijan to the United States